Harry Haft (also known as Herschel Haft; born  Hertzko or Hertzka Haft on 28 July  1925 in Bełchatów, Poland; died 3 November 2007) was a survivor of the Auschwitz concentration camp where he boxed fellow inmates to survive.  He was briefly a professional boxer in post-war Germany, and boxed as a light heavyweight in the United States from 1948–1949.

Early life
Born in Bełchatów, Poland on 28 July 1925, Haft's father died when he was three years old. In 1939, when he was 14, Haft witnessed the invasion and German occupation of Poland. Under Nazi occupation, he ran a smuggling business with his older brother.

Deportation to Auschwitz
By 1942, because he was Jewish, Haft was imprisoned in several German-Nazi slave labor camps where he was beaten and starved. Because of his strong physical stature, by 1943 an SS overseer trained him to be a boxer, and had him compete at fights to the death in front of the military personnel. The fights took place at the concentration camp Jaworzno, which was situated at a coal mine north of Auschwitz. Haft fought a total of 76 fights there. When the camp in Jaworzno was dissolved because of the advancing Soviet Red Army, thousands of its surviving inmates were sent West on death marches to Germany.  Haft managed to escape from one such march in April 1945. On the run, he killed a bathing German soldier and donned his uniform. During the remaining weeks until the end of the war, he moved from village to village. At one point he killed two elderly people who harbored him on their farm because he feared they had discovered he was not a German soldier and would turn him in to authorities.

Displaced Person's Camp refugee, 1945–1947
In 1945, Haft found refuge in a Displaced Person's Camp operated by the U.S. Army in occupied Germany.  In January 1947, he won an "Amateur Jewish Heavyweight Championship" organized by the US army in post-war Munich, receiving a trophy by General Lucius Clay.

Brief boxing career in America
In 1948, aged 22, he emigrated to the US with the help of an uncle in New Jersey. There he made his living by competing as a light heavyweight prizefighter during 1948 to 1949. Haft's professional record comprises 21 fights, of a total of 104 rounds, with 13 wins  (8 by KO) and 8 losses (5 by KO). His height was recorded as 5′ 9″  (175 cm), and his weight as between 168 and 180 lb.  He won his first twelve fights, but lost against a more experienced boxer, Irish-born Pat O'Connor in Westchester County Center on 5 January 1949.  O'Connor had previously held Irish National light heavy and middleweight championships.

He had a convincing win on 14 January 1949 in Binghamton, New York, 1:14 into the first of six rounds, when he scored a knockout, with a right cross that broke the jaw of his opponent Billy Kilby.  On 30 May 1949, though outweighed by 14 pounds, he defeated Johnny Pretzie in Brooklyn in a technical knockout, 2:38 into the fourth round.  Pretzie was a strong puncher with an impressive knockout record, who had met Rocky Marciano only two months earlier.

After this win, his record, which had included only two wins since his loss to O'Connor, continued a turn for the worse.  He lost to New Yorker Roland LaStarza on 27 June 1949 in a 4th-round TKO at Brooklyn's Coney Island.  LaStarza was undefeated, had an exceptional record of 33 wins, and had taken several Golden Gloves light heavyweight championships in 1944-5.  In 1953, LaStarza would challenge Rocky Marciano in a close fight for the World heavyweight championship.  Haft's final fight was against future champion Rocky Marciano, on 18 July 1949 in Rhode Island Auditorium, in what was Marciano's 18th professional fight.  Haft made a good showing in the first round, landing a blow to Marciano's stomach that was the bout's first punch, and went blow for blow in the first minute of the second, but was knocked out by Marciano in the first half of the third round after receiving a flurry of punches. In his biography, Haft claimed that he was threatened by the Mafia and forced to throw the fight against Marciano.

Harry is looking for work in New York City after the war, but he is met with anti-Semitic hostility from his potential employer.

The employer, a man named Mr. T, tells Harry that he won't hire Jews and tells him to leave. Harry is shocked and hurt by this discrimination, and he realizes that even in America, where he thought he would be safe from discrimination, he is not.

Marriage and boxing retirement
After his loss to Marciano, Haft retired. He married Miriam Wofsoniker in November 1949 and opened a fruit and vegetable store in Brooklyn.  His eldest son Alan Scott was born in 1950, followed by a daughter and another son.

In April 2007, Haft was inducted into the National Jewish Sports Hall of Fame. He died of cancer, in November of the same year, in Pembroke Pines, Florida, at the age of 82.

Legacy
Haft told his life's story to his son Alan Scott in 2003, who edited and published it in 2006, with contributions from historians John Radzilowski and Mike Silver. On the basis of the published biography, Reinhard Kleist created a graphic novel, which was published sequentially in the German periodical Frankfurter Allgemeine Zeitung during 2011. The book was nominated for a 2014 Ignatz Award for Outstanding Graphic Novel.

In 2018, a film about Haft was announced. The biographical film, titled The Survivor, is directed by Barry Levinson and stars Ben Foster as Haft. The film premiered at the Toronto International Film Festival in 2021 and was released on HBO on April 27, 2022, Yom HaShoah, Israel's Holocaust remembrance day.

Selected fights

|-
| align="center" colspan=8|2 Wins, 3 Losses
|-
| align="center" style="border-style: none none solid solid; background: #e3e3e3"|Result
| align="center" style="border-style: none none solid solid; background: #e3e3e3"|Opponent(s)
| align="center" style="border-style: none none solid solid; background: #e3e3e3"|Date
| align="center" style="border-style: none none solid solid; background: #e3e3e3"|Location
| align="center" style="border-style: none none solid solid; background: #e3e3e3"|Duration
| align="center" style="border-style: none none solid solid; background: #e3e3e3"|Notes
|-
| Loss
| Pat O'Connor
| 5 Jan 1949
| White Plains, NY
| 8 Rounds
| Was Irish light heavy champ          
|-
| Win
| Billy Kilby
| 14 Jan, 1949
| Binghamton, NY
| 1st Round KO  
| 
|-
| Win
| Johnny Pretzie
| 30 May 1949
| Coney Island, Brooklyn
| 4th Round KO 
| Pretzie had already fought Marciano
|-
| Loss
| Roland LaStarza
| 27 June 1949
| Coney Island, Brooklyn
| 4th Round TKO
| Heavyweight contenderUndefeated with 33 total wins 
|-
| Loss
| Rocky Marciano
| 18 July 1949
| Providence, RI
| 3rd Round KO
| Future World heavy champ
|-

See also
Salamo Arouch
Victor Perez
Szapsel Rotholc
Johann Trollmann
Tadeusz Pietrzykowski
Triumph of the Spirit

References

Further reading
 Alan Scott Haft: Harry Haft: Auschwitz Survivor, Challenger of Rocky Marciano published by Syracuse University Press, 2006. .
Joe Eskenazi, Holocaust boxer's story tragic and moving, but book has 'daddy issues', J. The Jewish News of Northern California, 16 June  2006.
 Reinhard Kleist, Der Boxer: die wahre Geshichet des Hertzko Haft, Comic Book (German), Carlsen Verlag, 2006
 Johanna Herzing, K.o. im KZ, Deutschlandfunk, 10 May 2009.

External links
A Look Back: Harry Haft (jewishboxing.blogspot.com)

1925 births
2007 deaths
Heavyweight boxers
American people of Polish-Jewish descent
Jewish American boxers
Auschwitz concentration camp survivors
Sportspeople from Bełchatów
Sportspeople from Łódź Voivodeship
Polish male boxers
American male boxers
20th-century American Jews
21st-century American Jews
Auschwitz boxers